Mount Hebron is a geographic region and geologic formation in the West Bank and Israel.

Mount Hebron may also refer to:
 Mt Hebron (Ellicott City), a historic house in Ellicott City, Maryland, United States
 Mount Hebron, California, United States
 Mount Hebron, New Brunswick, Canada
 Mount Hebron Cemetery (disambiguation)
 Mount Hebron High School in Ellicott City, Maryland, United States

See also 
 Hebron (disambiguation)